Leroy De Graft Rosenior  (born 24 August 1964) is a football coach and pundit. He is a former footballer whose clubs included Fulham, Queens Park Rangers (for whom he appeared as a substitute in the 1986 League Cup Final), Bristol City and West Ham United. Rosenior represented his birthplace England as a youth international, before formally switching to represent the Sierra Leone national football team.

Rosenior has managed clubs including Gloucester City, Merthyr Tydfil, Torquay United, Brentford and was assistant to Gary Peters at Shrewsbury Town.

His son, Liam, is a former professional footballer and the current head coach of Hull City.

Playing career

Club career
Rosenior was a striker for most of his career although towards the end of his playing days at Gloucester City he also turned out at centre-back, even in goal in a match against Kingstonian. He started at Fulham, also playing for Queens Park Rangers, West Ham United, Charlton Athletic, Bristol City and Fleet Town.

International career
He played for England at Under-16 and Under-21 levels but later changed allegiance to represent the Sierra Leone national team.
In total he gained one cap for Sierra Leone, it came in the form of a 1994 African Nations Cup qualifying game versus Togo in Conakry on 9 January 1993. Togo later withdrew from the competition.

Coaching and managerial career
After a period as Bristol City's youth team coach Rosenior's first managerial post was with Southern League Premier side Gloucester City. His first full season in charge saw Gloucester lose a third replay in the FA Trophy semi-final to Dagenham and Redbridge and defeat on the final day of the season to Salisbury City cost a place in the Football Conference, with local rivals Cheltenham Town being promoted. Rosenior left the following season, taking over Bristol City's reserve side.

Rosenior returned to non-league, managing Merthyr Tydfil before moving to Torquay United from July 2002 to January 2006, when he left the club by mutual consent after a 3–1 home defeat to Rochdale. In his second season in charge he took Torquay to promotion to Football League One, but was unable to keep them there, experiencing relegation on the last day of the season. The return to Football League Two heralded the departure of Alex Russell and Adebayo Akinfenwa, two of the club's best players. After languishing near the bottom of the league for half the season, Leroy eventually left the club by mutual consent.

In March 2006, he was named first team coach at Shrewsbury Town, acting as assistant to manager Gary Peters. He left in June 2006 to take up the managerial position at Brentford, succeeding Martin Allen. 20 years earlier he had replaced Allen when he came on as a substitute in the 1986 League Cup final. Five months after his appointment, Rosenior left the club, after a run of 16 games without a win, which culminated in a 4–0 home defeat to Crewe Alexandra.

He was scheduled to take charge of the Sierra Leone national side for a friendly against Leyton Orient in May 2007, which they won 4–2. It was announced in May 2007 that he would take charge of Sierra Leone in their upcoming African Nations Qualifiers.

Rosenior returned to Torquay United as head coach on 17 May 2007, replacing Keith Curle, but was reportedly sacked after 10 minutes, which gave him the record of the shortest managerial reign in the history of English football. This was because at the same time Torquay were bought by a local consortium which installed Colin Lee as chief executive, who then appointed former Gulls player and Exeter City assistant manager Paul Buckle as manager.

Honours
Player

Individual
PFA Team of the Year: 1987–88 Third Division
Fulham Player of the Year: 1987
Fulham Young Player of the Year: 1982

Manager

Torquay United
Third Division promotion: 2003–04

Other professional interests
Rosenior works as a presenter and pundit on G-Sports, an African Pay-Per-View channel, and for the BBC's coverage of the 2008 Africa Cup of Nations. Other punditry work has included BBC Radio 5 Live as well as The Football League Show and The League Cup Show on BBC television. He also appeared alongside fellow ex-pro Graeme Murty and presenter James Richardson in the BBC South, BBC South West and BBC West local Monday night football round-up show Late Kick Off.

Rosenior is a leading anti-racism campaigner in British football and travels the country working as an ambassador for the Show Racism The Red Card campaign. He was awarded an MBE in the 2019 New Year Honours, for his work in tackling discrimination in football and elsewhere in society.

References

External links
Memory Lane: Leroy Rosenior

1964 births
Living people
Sierra Leonean footballers
Sierra Leonean football managers
Sierra Leone international footballers
English footballers
English football managers
England under-21 international footballers
England youth international footballers
English sportspeople of Sierra Leonean descent
British people of Sierra Leone Creole descent
Sierra Leone Creole people
Bristol City F.C. players
Charlton Athletic F.C. players
Fulham F.C. players
Queens Park Rangers F.C. players
West Ham United F.C. players
Gloucester City A.F.C. players
Gloucester City A.F.C. managers
Brentford F.C. managers
Torquay United F.C. managers
Black British sportsmen
English association football commentators
English Football League players
English Football League managers
Footballers from Clapham
People educated at the Strand School
Fleet Town F.C. players
Association football forwards
Shrewsbury Town F.C. non-playing staff
Merthyr Tydfil F.C. managers
Members of the Order of the British Empire